The Serbian League West is a section of the Serbian League, Serbia's third football league. Teams from the western part of Serbia are in this section of the league. The other sections are Serbian League East, Serbian League Vojvodina, and Serbian League Belgrade.

Teams
The following teams participated in the Serbian League West in 2010–11:

 FK Budućnost Valjevo
 FK FAP
 FK Jedinstvo Ub
 FK Mačva Šabac
 FK Polet Ljubić
 FK Partizan Bumbarevo Brdo
 FK Radnički Stobex
 FK Rudar Kostolac
 FK Sloboda Čačak
 FK Sloga Bajina Bašta
 FK Sloga Kraljevo
 FK Sloga Petrovac
 FK Sloga Požega
 FK Šumadija Aranđelovac
 FK Vujić Voda
 FK Železničar Lajkovac

League table

References

External links
 Football Association of Region West Serbia - Official Site

Serbian League West seasons
3
Serb